Corso Italia is a name sometimes used for a city's Little Italy district. Corso Italia may refer to:

 Corso Italia (Genoa)
 Corso Italia (Ottawa)
 Sorrento - Corso Italia (Sorrento)
 Corso Italia (Toronto)